Fargo South Residential District is a  historic district in Fargo, North Dakota that was listed on the National Register of Historic Places in 1983.

It dates from 1884 and includes Late 19th and 20th Century Revivals architecture and Late Victorian architecture.

The listing included 260 contributing buildings.

Fifty houses in the district are in the Arts and Crafts movement's English Cottage style.

References

Houses on the National Register of Historic Places in North Dakota
Houses in Fargo, North Dakota
Victorian architecture in North Dakota
Historic districts on the National Register of Historic Places in North Dakota
National Register of Historic Places in Cass County, North Dakota
Neighborhoods in North Dakota
1884 establishments in Dakota Territory